Baron Lorens von der Linde (July 30, 1610 – June 25, 1670) was a:
Swedish Generalmajor since 1647
Swedish General since 1655
Swedish Field Marshal (after 1665).

He was commander of Swedish forces in Royal Prussia during Deluge (history) (at least in year 1659).

1610 births
1670 deaths
Field marshals of Sweden
17th-century Swedish military personnel